Portia Boakye (born 17 April 1989) is a Ghanaian international footballer who plays as a forward /defender for Djurgården in Sweden. She is regarded as one of the best left-footed players on the Africa continent.

Club career

Östersunds DFF 2016
In May 2016 she signed for Östersunds DFF  and made her first debut for Östersunds DFF against AIK coming in as a substitute on the 46th minute and scored the only goal in that match against AIK on the 67th minute.

In August 2016, Portia again scored the only goal in the second round of the  Elitettan match against AIK in  Stockholm.

She again continued with her impressive form for Östersunds DFF against Sunnanå SK, coming in as a substitute on the 55th minute when Östersunds DFF was down by a goal, she equalised the goal during the 60th minute, and also went on to score a second goal in the match in the 70th minute to put Östersunds DFF in a lead which helped Östersunds DFF to win the match by 3–1 against Sunnana, after the match she was given the Woman of the match award. She ended the season with  Östersunds DFF scoring seven League goals and also two goals during the cup matches.

Trabzon İdmanocağı
In 2017, she signed a season deal with Trabzon İdmanocağı to participate in the Turkish Women's First Football League.

International career

Ghana
In June 2010, Boakye scored in Ghana's 3–0 win over Senegal at the Accra Sports Stadium. The win secured Ghana's place at the 2010 African Women's Championship finals.

Boakye was part of the national team which competed in the 2014 African Women's Championship qualification and the 2014 African Women's Championship, playing in all seven of the team's matches. She played in a friendly match against South Africa in May 2014 and scored the winning goal. She also scored the winning goal in the 2015 All-Africa Games final, with three minutes until the end of the 90 minutes regulation time, to win Ghana's first ever gold in the competition.

In December 2015 she was nominated for African Women's Footballer of the Year, with Paris Saint-Germain defender Ngozi Ebere, Gabrielle Onguene, Gaelle Enganamouit. She lost this award to Gaelle Enganamouit of FC Rosengård.

In June 2016, she was Voted by the Sport Writers Association of Ghana as the best female footballer of the year

International goals

Honours

International
Ghana
All African Games Gold Medal: 2015
Africa Women Cup of Nations Bronze  Medal: 2016
WAFU Women's Cup Gold Medal and top scorer: 2018

References

External links
Portia Boakye nominated for CAF Women's Player of the Year

Living people
1989 births
Ghanaian women's footballers
Ghana women's international footballers
African Games gold medalists for Ghana
African Games medalists in football
Expatriate women's footballers in Turkey
Ghanaian expatriate sportspeople in Turkey
Ferencvárosi TC (women) footballers
Trabzon İdmanocağı women's players
Women's association football forwards
Competitors at the 2015 African Games
Damallsvenskan players
Djurgårdens IF Fotboll (women) players
Ghanaian expatriate women's footballers
Fabulous Ladies F.C. players